Olaf II, Oluf II or Olof II may refer to:

 Olaf II of Norway, king, 995 – 29 July 1030
 Amlaíb Cuarán, king of Dublin, c. 900–981
 Olof Björnsson, king of Sweden, reigned c. 970 – 975
 Olaf the Black, king of Man, mid-13th
 Olaf Haraldsen, anti-king of Denmark, died 
 Olaf II of Denmark, king, 1370 – 23 August 1387